Siege of Breda or Capture of Breda may refer to:

Siege of Breda (1577) by States-General troops 
Capture of Breda (1581) by Claude de Berlaymont, lord of Castle Haultepenne (no real siege, but an urban fight, also known as "The Haultepenne Fury")
Capture of Breda (1590) by Maurice of Orange (no real siege, but an urban fight)
Siege of Breda (1624) by Ambrogio Spinola (painted by Velázquez in The Surrender of Breda)
Siege of Breda (1637) by Frederick Henry, Prince of Orange
Siege of Breda (1793) by François Joseph Westermann during the War of the First Coalition
Siege of Breda (1813) by François Roguet and Charles Lefebvre-Desnouettes